George Roberts may refer to:

Military
 George Arthur Roberts (1891–1970), Trinidadian soldier and fireman
 Philip Roberts (British Army officer) (George Philip Bradley Roberts, 1906–1997), British World War II general
 George R. Roberts (privateer) (1766-1861), Black American privateer
 George S. Roberts (1918–1984), U.S. Army Air Force officer and  Tuskegee Airman
 George W. Roberts (1833–1862), American Union Army officer

Politics
 George E. Roberts (1857–1948), director of the U.S. Mint
 George Roberts (Victorian politician) (1868–1925), Australian politician
 George Roberts (British politician) (1868–1928), British Labour MP, Minister of Labour
 George Roberts (Newfoundland politician) (c. 1845–1920), ship owner, newspaper owner, politician in Newfoundland
 George Roberts (Western Australian politician) (1913–1962), Australian politician
 Sir George Fossett Roberts (1870–1954), Welsh army officer and politician

Sports
 George Quinlan Roberts (1860–1943), Tasmanian-born rower
 George Roberts (rugby union) (1914–1943), Scottish player
 George Roberts (American football) (born 1955), American football player
 George Roberts (rower) (born 1980), Australian rower

Other
 George Roberts (antiquary) (died 1860), English schoolmaster and Dorset local historian
 George Brooke Roberts (1833–1897), civil engineer
 George Roberts (aircraft engineer) (1909–2009), Australian aircraft engineer
 George Roberts (publisher) (1873–1953), Irish actor, poet and publisher
 George R. Roberts (born 1944), American financier with Kohlberg Kravis Roberts
 George Roberts (trombonist) (1928–2014), American trombonist
 George Roberts (priest), English priest
 George Roberts, Barbie's father of the Barbie franchise